Columbia University in New York City, New York, as one of the oldest universities in the United States, has been the subject of numerous aspects of popular culture. Film historian Rob King explains that the university's popularity with filmmakers has to do with its being one of the few colleges with a physical campus located in New York City, and its neoclassical architecture, which "aestheticizes America’s intellectual history," making Columbia an ideal shooting location and setting for productions that involve urban universities. Additionally, campus monuments such as Alma Mater and the university's copy of The Thinker have come to symbolize academic reflection and university prestige in popular culture. Room 309 in Havemeyer Hall has been described as the most filmed college classroom in the United States.

Historical events on Columbia's campus have also served to draw attention to the university. The Beat Generation, which began at Columbia with students Allen Ginsberg, Jack Kerouac, and Lucien Carr, among others, is often associated with the university, which served as a conservative backdrop to the writers' literary experimentation. The university has often been portrayed in relation to the movement, including in Vanity of Duluoz by Kerouac and the film Kill Your Darlings, which depicts the earliest days of the movement at Columbia.

The Columbia University protests of 1968 were the target of heavy media attention while they transpired, and since have been the subject of numerous depictions, including memoirs, such as The Strawberry Statement by James Simon Kunen and the film based on it; novels, such as 4 3 2 1 by Paul Auster; films, such as Across the Universe and 84 Charing Cross Road; and numerous documentaries, including Columbia Revolt and A Time to Stir, edited by Paul Cronin. The protests have also been the subject of significant academic inquiry, and has, along with subsequent protests throughout the decades, cemented Columbia's reputation as a hotbed for counterculture and student activism.

Film

Movies making reference to Columbia and/or featuring scenes shot on Columbia's campus include:
 3 lb 
 A Midsummer Night's Sex Comedy 
 Across the Universe
 Altered States
 Anger Management 
 August Rush
 Awakenings
 Black and White 
 Butterfield 8
 Charlie Bartlett
 Crimes and Misdemeanors 
 Cruising
 The Detective
 Digimon Adventure: Last Evolution Kizuna
 Enchanted 
 Eternal Sunshine of the Spotless Mind
 Everyone Says I Love You
 Finding Forrester
 Ghostbusters
 Ghostbusters II
 Ghostbusters (2016)
 Hannah and Her Sisters
 Hitch
 Husbands and Wives
 Igby Goes Down
 In the Blood (2006)
 Ishtar
 It's My Turn
 K-PAX
 Kabhi Alvida Na Kehna
 Kill Your Darlings
 Kinsey
 Love the Hard Way
 Made of Honor
 The Magic Garden of Stanley Sweetheart
 Malcolm X
 Manhattan
 Marathon Man
 The Mirror Has Two Faces
 Mona Lisa Smile
 Music of the Heart
 The Nanny Diaries
 New York Minute
 North
 Porn 'n Chicken'''
 The Post Premium Rush The Princess Diaries The Pride of the Yankees The Producers: The Movie Musical P.S. Punchline Quiz Show Real Women Have Curves The Rock Rollover Simon The Sisterhood of the Traveling Pants Spider-Man Spider-Man 2 Spider-Man 3 Stay Still Alice Tadpole Ta Ra Rum Pum Teacher's Pet The WordsMusic
 The music video for the Fugees' single "Nappy Heads" (recorded in 1992 but not released until 1994) was partially shot on the steps of Low Library of Columbia University, where one of the members, Lauryn Hill, was a student.
 The Indigo Girls song, "Free of Hope," contains the lyrics, "Big brother's at Columbia University; quote unquote, he's tanning beaver pelts."
 Recording artist Nellie McKay released a song on her second album Pretty Little Head (2006), entitled "Columbia Is Bleeding", alleging animal abuse as part of the practice of animal testing at Columbia University.
 Vampire Weekend, which was founded at Columbia, frequently references the university in its lyrics, including in "Oxford Comma", "Harmony Hall", and "One (Blake's Got a New Face)".

 Video games 
Due to its location in Manhattan, Columbia's campus frequently appears in video games that seek to replicate New York City in their maps, such as Grand Theft Auto IV (2008), as Vespucci University in the neighborhood of Varsity Heights; Assassin's Creed III (2012), as King's College in the late 18th century; and Marvel's Spider-Man'' (2018). The designs for university buildings in Cities: Skylines are based on the neoclassical architecture of the university.

Fictional Columbians

References 

Popular culture, in
American universities and colleges in popular culture